Sophronica grisea is a species of beetle in the family Cerambycidae. It was described by Per Olof Christopher Aurivillius in 1908.

Subspecies
 Sophronica grisea grisea Aurivillius, 1908
 Sophronica grisea subannulicornis Breuning, 1968

References

Sophronica
Beetles described in 1908